Rhinocypha uenoi is a species of damselfly in the family Chlorocyphidae. It is endemic to Japan. 
Rhinocypha uenoi are a very endangered species.

References

Insects of Japan
Chlorocyphidae
Insects described in 1964
Taxonomy articles created by Polbot